Mitsubishi Evolution may refer to:

 Mitsubishi Lancer Evolution
 Mitsubishi Pajero Evolution